Philosophical Papers is an international, generalist journal of philosophy, appearing three times a year. Philosophical Papers is primarily based in the Department of Philosophy at Rhodes University in Grahamstown and it is jointly edited by the philosophy departments of Rhodes and the University of the Witwatersrand in Johannesburg.

See also
 Rhodes University
 University of the Witwatersrand

External links
 Philosophical Papers

References

Philosophy journals
English-language journals
Triannual journals
Publications established in 1986
Rhodes University
University of the Witwatersrand